Diospyros pyrrhocarpa is a tree in the family Ebenaceae. Twigs dry greyish to brownish. Inflorescences bear up to three flowers. The specific epithet  is from the Greek meaning "fiery red or yellow fruits". Habitat is lowland mixed dipterocarp forests. D. pyrrhocarpa is found from the Andaman and Nicobar Islands to the Philippines. In Cebu and Negros Regions in the Philippines, the tree is commonly known as Kunalum.

References

pyrrhocarpa
Plants described in 1861
Flora of the Andaman Islands
Flora of the Nicobar Islands
Trees of Thailand
Trees of Malesia
Taxa named by Friedrich Anton Wilhelm Miquel